Dorna Sports, S.L. is the commercial rights' holder for the motorcycling sport of Grand Prix racing.

Established in 1988 as an international sports management and marketing company, it is headquartered in Madrid, with branch offices and/or subsidiaries in Barcelona, Amsterdam, London and Rome. Established by Banco Banesto as Dorna promoción del deporte, the company was sold to CVC Madrid in 1998 as the operation developed internationally and was renamed Dorna Sports. Private equity group Bridgepoint has been the majority shareholder of Dorna since 2006.

Rights holdings 
Since 1992 Dorna has been the exclusive holder of all commercial and television rights relating to the World Championship series and since 2013 the Superbike World Championship. The company also participates in the management and marketing of other motorsports properties, including: the Spanish Road Racing Championship (CEV), the British Superbike Championship (BSB) and the Trials World Championships (Indoor and Outdoor).

MotoGP 
Dorna recognised, with support from manufacturers, that a change was needed in the sport. The costs of developing specialist two-stroke engines, which created non-commercial end products, was not sustainable. Hence, in its efforts to bring about the change from 500 cc racing to MotoGP four-stroke racing, Dorna has obtained the world championship organization rights from the FIM (Fédération Internationale de Motocyclisme) which is the world governing sole body of motorcycling with authority to organise motorcycle world championships.

Ownership

Set up by Banco Banesto as Dorna promocion del deporte, the company was sold to CVC Madrid in 1998 as the operation developed internationally and was renamed Dorna Sports. The purchase was closely supervised by American Hardy McLain, cost $80 million (approximately), half of which was needed to pay off Dorna debt. McLain, one of the founders of CVC and formerly an executive of Citibank (CVC was spun out of Citibank in 1981), was present at several motorcycle Grand Prix events in 1998 but, confident in the ability of Dorna CEO Carmelo Ezpeleta, has left the running of the company to the Spaniard, as well as the almost completely Spanish Dorna executive leadership.

Sale to management
In November 2005 CVC Capital Partners announced it was to acquire the 25% and 48% shares of Bambino and Bayerische Landesbank in Formula1 commercial rights' holder SLEC and acquired the shares of JPMorgan Chase in December 2005. This deal was given approval by the European Commission on 21 March 2006 subject to the sale of Dorna Sports.

By divesting Dorna, the Commission concluded that CVC’s Formula One transaction would not cause competition concerns. Competition commissioner Neelie Kroes, said: “When the two most popular motor sport events in the EU, Formula One and Moto GP, come in the hands of one owner, there is a risk of price increases for the TV rights to these events and a reduction in consumer choice. I am satisfied that the commitments given by CVC will eliminate this risk.” Its final 71% stake in Dorna was sold by CVC for £400million on 28 March, selling the holding to Dorna Sports management.

Questionable practices
In 2005, with the growth of the Internet, Dorna began the controversial practice of charging for Press Credentials for online publications. The "fee" varied from 100 euros to 1000 euros. Most newsworthy publications turned their back on this flagrant exploitation by the event promoter.

References

External links
Official website

Companies established in 1988
Entertainment companies of Spain
Sport in Madrid
Grand Prix motorcycle racing
CVC Capital Partners companies
Private equity portfolio companies
1988 establishments in Spain
CPP Investment Board companies